Henri Duez (born 18 December 1937) is a retired French cyclist. He competed at the 1960 Summer Olympics in the 100 km team time trial and finished in seventh place. He won the Route de France in 1959 and Volta a Catalunya in 1961. In 1965 he won a one-day race in Lubersac and finished 14th in the Tour de France.

References 

1937 births
Living people
Cyclists at the 1960 Summer Olympics
Olympic cyclists of France
French male cyclists
Sportspeople from Pas-de-Calais
Cyclists from Hauts-de-France